Biddulphiaceae is a family of diatom in the order Biddulphiales. The Biddulphiaceae are distinguished from the Eupodiscaceae by their pseudocelli, where the Eupodiscaceae have fully developed ocelli. Both families commonly inhabit the littoral zone of the ocean, close to the shore. Sixteen species of Biddulphiaceae are found on the west coast of India.

Genera 
† Alveoflexus - N.I. Hendey & P.A. Sims, 1984 
† Ancoropsis - N.I. Hendey & P.A. Sims, 1984 
Arcusidiscus - S.Komura, 2008
Biddulphia - S.F. Gray, 1821
Biddulphiopsis - H.A. von Stosch & R. Simonsen, 1984
† Donskinica - Strelnikova & Kozyrenko
† Euodiella - P.A. Sims, 2000
† Fenneria - J.Witkowski, 2018
Hydrosera - G.C. Wallich, 1858
Isthmia - C. A. Agardh, 1832
† Medlinia - P.A. Sims, 1998
Neohuttonia - O. Kuntze, 1898
Pseudotriceratium - A. Grunow, 1884
Stoermeria - J.P. Kociolek, L. Escobar & S. Richardson, 1996
Terpsinoë - C.G. Ehrenberg, 1843
Trigonium - P.T. Cleve, 1867

Gallery

References

Diatom families
Taxa described in 1844
Taxa named by Friedrich Traugott Kützing